Funny Farm is a comic novel written by Jay Cronley. It was published in 1985 by Atheneum Books.  

In 1988, it was adapted into a film of the same name, starring Chevy Chase. It was Cronley's first novel to be adapted for an American film.

References

1985 American novels
American comedy novels
American novels adapted into films
Atheneum Books books